Hugh Montgomerie may refer to
Hugh Montgomerie, 1st Earl of Eglinton (c. 1460–1545)
Hugh Montgomerie, 3rd Earl of Eglinton (d. 1585)
Hugh Montgomerie, 7th Earl of Eglinton (1613–1669)
Hugh Montgomerie, 12th Earl of Eglinton (1739–1819), amateur cellist and composer

See also
Hugh Montgomery (disambiguation)
Hugh of Montgomery, 2nd Earl of Shrewsbury (d. 1098)